Sahaganj is a locality in Bansberia Municipality of Hooghly district in the Indian state of West Bengal. It is a part of the area covered by Kolkata Metropolitan Development Authority (KMDA).

Geography

Ward No. 1 of Bansberia Municipality and parts of Ward Nos. 1,2 and 3 of Hooghly Chinsurah Municipality cover Sahaganj.

Demographics
According to the 2011 Census of India, Ward No. 1 of Bansberia municipality had a total population of 2,089 of which 1,084 (51%) were males and 1,005 (49%) were females. Population in the age range 0–6 years was 143. The total number of literate persons in Ward No. 1 was 1,721 (88.44% of the population over 6 years).

Dunlop at Sahaganj
Dunlop India Ltd. opened its first factory in India at Sahaganj in 1936. It pioneered the manufacture of cycle, automobile and aeroplane tyres. In 1952, it started producing foam cushioning, transmission belting and Vee belts.  Conveyor belting and long length braided hose were added to the range later on.

Dunlop Rubber, founded in 1889, was a British multinational involved in the manufacture of various rubber products. By the end of the Second World War, around 1946, starting with Fort Dunlop, Erdington, a suburb of Birmingham in Britain, Dunlop had manufacturing facilities in the United States, Canada, France, Germany, Japan, Ireland, South Africa and India. It had sales outlets in nearly every country in the world. Then the Monopolies and Restrictive Prices Commission forced some pricing changes. In the early sixties Dunlop opted for the cheaper textile radial tyres rather than the steel belted radial tyres. The British car industry declined and the 1973 oil crisis compounded matters. Dunlop started losing markets. As its business declined it started selling off many of its companies, including that in India.

Birmingham’s Dunlop plant was closed on 30 May 2014 after being in operation for 125 years.

In 1984, Manu Chhabria, the Dubai-based Indian businessman, arrived in India as a "corporate raider". He picked up controlling stake, in association with the R. P. Goenka’s  RPG Group, in Dunlop India, which was then ailing. He subsequently took single-handed control of the company.

The Sahaganj factory faced major hurdles, first with a 97-days strike by the trade unions in 1988, and then in the early nineties with conflicting vision and strategies of the professional managers and owners over falling fortunes of the company. Several top executives, including the managing director, Murli Dhar Shukla, left the company. In 1998, the management of Dunlop moved the BIFR for registration as a sick company. Manu Chhabria died in  2002, and Pawan Kumar Ruia purchased Dunlop in 2005 from the Chhabria family controlled Jumbo Group. At the time of take over, the plant at Sahaganj was closed and employed 2,700 workers. It was taken out of BIFR in 2007. Amongst the other units in Pawan Kumar Ruiya's kitty is Jessop & Company.

Both the earlier Left Front government and the present Trinamul Congress government, in West Bengal, have expressed concern about the state of affairs in Dunlop India, for many years a blue-chip company, but, except for  short periods in 2008, 2011 and 2014, Dunlop’s Sahaganj factory has remained closed. In 2011, 800 employees remained on its rolls.

Transport
State Highway 6 (West Bengal)/ Grand Trunk Road skirts the western edge of Sahaganj.

Education
Dunlop English Medium School is located in Dunlop Estate at Sahaganj.

Sahaganj Dunlop Hindi School is located in Ward No. 1 of Bansberia Municipality. It was established in 1961.

Sahaganj Dunlop High School is a Bengali-medium high school located in Ward No. 1 of Bansberia Municipality. It was established in 1952.

Saraswati World School is located near Dunlop Mor at Sahaganj.

References

Cities and towns in Hooghly district
Neighbourhoods in Kolkata
Kolkata Metropolitan Area